Reservoir railway station is located on the Mernda line in Victoria, Australia. It serves the northern Melbourne suburb of Reservoir, and it opened on 8 October 1889 as Preston-Reservoir. It was renamed Reservoir on 1 December 1909.

History
Reservoir station opened on 8 October 1889, when the Inner Circle line was extended from North Fitzroy. On 23 December of that year, the line was extended to Epping. Like the suburb itself, the station was named after the three reservoirs that were built south-east of the station, in 1864, 1909 and 1913 respectively. The reservoirs were provided to hold Melbourne's water supply from the Yan Yean Reservoir.

The station was the terminus for suburban services on the Whittlesea line. The line was duplicated in December 1910 and, in July 1921, Reservoir became the terminus for electric trains. In 1924, an 8-metre-long turntable was provided at the station, to turn the AEC railmotor which operated between Reservoir and Whittlesea, operating two trips a day. In December 1929, electric trains were extended to Thomastown, and in 1940, the turntable was abolished.

In 1959, duplication of the line to Keonpark was provided. In 1963, manually operated boom barriers replaced hand operated gates at the former High Street level crossing, which was located at the Down end of the station.

In the early hours of 13 July 1975, a deliberately lit fire damaged Harris motor 567M and Tait motor 345M, both of which were stabled at the station.

On 18 December 1986, a number of sidings and signals were abolished. On 1 April 1987, further sidings were abolished. On 8 May 1988, the former signal box and interlocked frame were abolished. Also abolished were two crossovers, formerly located at the Up and Down ends of the station, as well as the double line block signalling system between Reservoir and Keon Park, which was replaced with automatic three-position signalling. Pedestrian gates were also provided at the former station pedestrian crossing, which was located at the Down end, and at the former High Street level crossing. Two months earlier, the double line block system between Bell and Reservoir had been abolished.

In 1991, a reconfigured High Street level crossing was provided, with that arrangement existing until the grade separation of the level crossing in 2019. On 25 June 1996, Reservoir was upgraded to a Premium Station.

In January 2016, the Level Crossing Removal Authority announced that the High Street level crossing would be removed by grade separation. In September 2018, preliminary designs were released, showing the grade separation as elevated rail with a new station in the current location. Plans for grade separation have dated as far back as the early to mid 1970s.

On 2 December 2019, the ground-level station was closed to the general public for demolition, and the new station, elevated above a multi-road intersection, was opened on 16 December of that year. As part of the work, crossovers were reinstated at both the Up and Down ends of the rebuilt station.

Platforms and services
Reservoir has one island platform with two faces. It is served by Mernda line trains.

Platform 1:
  all stations and limited express services to Flinders Street

Platform 2:
  all stations services to Mernda

Transport links
Dysons operates seven routes via Reservoir station, under contract to Public Transport Victoria:
 : to La Trobe University Bundoora Campus
 : North East Reservoir to Northcote Plaza
 : Preston to West Preston
 : Pacific Epping to Northland Shopping Centre
 : Pacific Epping to Northland Shopping Centre
 : to North West Reservoir
 : Macleod to Pascoe Vale station

Gallery

References

External links
 Melway map at street-directory.com.au

Premium Melbourne railway stations
Railway stations in Melbourne
Railway stations in Australia opened in 1889
Railway stations in the City of Darebin